Geneviève Albert is a Canadian filmmaker from Quebec, whose debut feature film Noemie Says Yes (Noémie dit oui) was released in 2022.

She previously directed a number of short films, including Paul Hébert, le rêveur acharné (2007), Reviens-tu ce soir? (2008), La vie heureuse de Gilles Z (2010), La traversée du salon (2011), Entre mon nom et ton film (2014), Pancakes & Kisses (2014) and Eroticfism (2015), and had a stage role in Cirque du Soleil's 2015 show Iris.

Noemie Says Yes was nominated for the John Dunning Best First Feature Award at the 11th Canadian Screen Awards in 2023.

References

External links

21st-century Canadian screenwriters
21st-century Canadian women writers
Canadian women screenwriters
Canadian women film directors
Canadian screenwriters in French
Film directors from Quebec
Living people